Kapitein Rob en het Geheim van Professor Lupardi (Captain Rob and the Secret of Professor Lupardi) is a 2007 Dutch adventure film, directed by Hans Pos and based on Evert Werkman and Pieter J. Kuhn's eponymous newspaper comic Kapitein Rob.

The script was written by De Waal and Hans Pos in collaboration with their production companies Screenpartners and Shooting Star Films. It received a Gouden Film award in 2007 and a MovieSquad Junior Award in 2008, but was otherwise neither a critical nor a commercial success. Critic Jan Pieter Ekker of De Volkskrant felt the story was comparable to "cardboard" and that its low budget showed too much.

Plot

Captain Rob has to babysit Stijn and Sandra, the children of his sister Marga, when he hears that a cargo of gold has been stolen when the ship sailed through a mysterious mist. He receives the mission to investigate the matter immediately and takes the children with him. Along his journey he meets the weatherwoman Paula. They eventually discover that the evil professor Lupardi and his assistant Yoto have stolen the gold to make an ultra crystal which can change the weather...

Cast
 Thijs Römer: Kapitein Rob
 Robert Ruigrok van der Werve: Stijn
 Emilie Pos: Sandra
 Katja Schuurman: Paula
 Arjan Ederveen: Professor Lupardi
 Alex Klaasen: Yoto
 Jack Wouterse: General
 Hans Dagelet: Cigaret Larry
 Ricky Koole: Marga
 Hans Kesting: Chief commandos
 Yannick de Waal: Sammie
 Marcel Roelfsma: Chief guard
 Stijn Westenend: Researcher
 Mike Reus: Scientist
 Kenneth Herdigein: Commander
 Richard Kemper: Oscar
 Jennifer Hoffman: Millionaire's daughter
 Wouter Bos: Prime Minister
 Joost Prinsen: Police inspector
 Marisa van Eyle: Tante Annie

Sources

External links
 https://www.imdb.com/title/tt0887750/
 https://www.zapp.nl/zappbios/zappbios-kapitein-rob-en-het-geheim-van-professor-lupardi
 https://www.vpro.nl/cinema/films/film~2815568~kapitein-rob-en-het-geheim-van-professor-lupardi~.html
 https://www.filmfestival.nl/publiek/films/kapitein-rob-en-het-geheim-van-professor-lupardi

2000s Dutch-language films
Dutch adventure films
Dutch children's films
2007 films
Films based on Dutch comics
Films set in the Netherlands
Films shot in the Netherlands
2000s adventure films
Live-action films based on comics